The following are the Pulitzer Prizes for 1944.

Journalism awards
Public Service:
 The New York Times for its survey of the teaching of American history.
Reporting:
 Paul Schoenstein and associates of the New York Journal American, for a news story published on August 12, 1943, which saved the life of a two-year-old girl in the Lutheran Hospital of New York City by obtaining penicillin.
Correspondence:
 Ernest Taylor Pyle of the Scripps-Howard Newspaper Alliance, for distinguished war correspondence during the year 1943.
Telegraphic Reporting (National):
 Dewey L. Fleming of The Baltimore Sun, for his distinguished reporting during the year 1943.
Telegraphic Reporting (International):
 Daniel De Luce of the Associated Press, for his distinguished reporting during the year 1943.
Editorial Writing:
 Henry J. Haskell of The Kansas City Star, for editorials written during the calendar year 1943.
Editorial Cartooning:
Clifford K. Berryman of the Evening Star (Washington D.C.), for "But Where Is the Boat Going?"
Photography:
 Earle L. Bunker of the Omaha World-Herald, for his photo entitled, "Homecoming".
 Frank Filan of the Associated Press, for his photo entitled "Tarawa Island".
Special Citations:
 Byron Price, Director of the Office of Censorship, for the creation and administration of the newspaper and radio codes.
 William Allen White was honored with a scroll indicating appreciation of his services for seven years as a member of the Pulitzer Prize advisory board, presented posthumously to his widow.

Letters, Drama and Music Awards
Novel:
 Journey in the Dark by Martin Flavin (Harper).
Drama:
No award given
History:
 The Growth of American Thought by Merle Curti (Harper).
Biography or Autobiography:
 The American Leonardo: The Life of Samuel F. B. Morse by Carleton Mabee (Knopf).
Poetry:
 Western Star by Stephen Vincent Benét (Farrar).
Music:
 Symphony No. 4. Opus 34 by Howard Hanson (Eastman School of Music). Performed by the Boston Symphony Orchestra on December 3, 1943
Special Award:
 In lieu of the Drama prize, a special award was given to Richard Rodgers and Oscar Hammerstein II, for Oklahoma!

References

External links
Pulitzer Prizes for 1944

Pulitzer Prizes by year
Pulitzer Prize
Pulitzer Prize